Johnny Blaze may refer to:

 Ghost Rider (Johnny Blaze), second Marvel Comics character called Ghost Rider
 Johnny Blaze, ring name of John Morrison (wrestler)
 Johnny Blaze, alter-ego of American rapper Method Man

See also
Johnny Blais (1971–2007), American triathlete